Smoke in the Shadows is the fifth album by American singer-songwriter Lydia Lunch, released in November 2004 by record labels Atavistic and Breakin Beats.

Reception 

Uncut wrote that it "may be the best thing she's done in years". Tiny Mix Tapes wrote that it "distills a myriad of diverse interests into a focused and effective album." PopMatters called it "Lunch's most listenable record since Queen of Siam, but since she's no longer capable of (or interested in) surprising us or conveying convincing vulnerability, it lacks anything as truly chilling as 'Mechanical Flattery'."

Track listing

Personnel 

Lydia Lunch – vocals, production, design
Joseph Berardi – vibraphone on "Hangover Hotel", "Johnny Behind the Deuce" and "I Love How You..."
Adele Bertei – backing vocals
Carla Bozulich – vocals on "I Love How You...", backing vocals on "Hot Tip"
Alex Cline – drums on "Hangover Hotel", "Johnny Behind the Deuce" and "I Love How You..."
Nels Cline – guitar, record producer
Terry Edwards – all instruments on "Portrait of the Minus Man"
John Fumo – trumpet on "Hangover Hotel", "Johnny Behind the Deuce" and "I Love How You..."
Vinny Golia – alto flute and baritone saxophone on "Hangover Hotel", "Johnny Behind the Deuce" and "I Love How You..."
Tommy Grenas – guitar, drums, synthesizer, production
Joel Hamilton – double bass on "Hangover Hotel", "Johnny Behind the Deuce" and "I Love How You..."
Niels Van Hoorn – saxophone
Ryan Kirk – guitar on "Blame"
Chuck Manning – alto saxophone on "Hangover Hotel", "Johnny Behind the Deuce" and "I Love How You..."
Don Ostermann – trombone on "Hangover Hotel", "Johnny Behind the Deuce" and "I Love How You..."
Len Del Rio – synthesizer, organ, piano, programming, production, mixing, recording
Ryan Kirk – engineering
Wayne Peet – mixing, recording
Marc Viaplana – photography, design

References

External links 

 

2004 albums
Lydia Lunch albums